Fábio Roberto Gomes Netto, known as Fábio Gomes or simply Fábio, (born 25 May 1997) is a Brazilian professional footballer who plays as a centre-forward for Primeira Liga club Paços de Ferreira, on loan from Atlético Mineiro.

Club career

Early career
Born in São Paulo, Fábio Gomes started his career with the youth setup of Nacional-SP and switched to the academy of Grêmio Osasco in 2016.
He signed his first contract in 2017 with Audax. A year later he moved to Oeste in Itápolis.

Audax
Fábio Gomes made his professional debut with Audax on 13 August 2017 as a halftime substitute in a Copa Paulista 0-0 draw against Inter de Limeira. On 30 August 2017, he scored his first goal for the club in a 3-1 victory against Atibaia.

Oeste
Fábio Gomes debuted with Oeste on 8 March 2019 and scored his first goal for the club in a 2-1 defeat against Red Bull Brasil in the Campeonato Paulista. On 27 July 2019, Fábio scored his first goal in Série B, scoring in the last minute of the match in a 1-0 victory against Londrina.

Fábio Gomes ended his first full season with Oeste Futebol Clube as the second top scorer in the Campeonato Brasileiro Série B with 15 goals. Fábio's play helped him draw the attention of Série A clubs, including Botafogo who were interested in signing him.

After a brief stint in Japan, Fábio Gomes returned to a struggling Oeste Futebol Clube in November 2020, scoring 5 goals in 15 appearances as the club was relegated to the Campeonato Brasileiro Série C. His last goal of the season came on 13 January 2021, when he scored the lone goal of the match in a 1-0 victory over Cruzeiro.

Loan to Albirex Niigata
In January 2020, Fábio Gomes signed with Japanese club, Albirex Niigata on loan in the J2 League. Fábio debuted with Albirex Niigata on 23 February 2020 as a 66th-minute substitute scoring the third goal for his club in a 3-0 victory over Thespakusatsu Gunma. He scored 5 goals in 19 appearances for the club, but his contract was cancelled less than a year later after suspicion of drunk driving.

Loan to New York Red Bulls
On 5 February 2021, Fábio Gomes joined the New York Red Bulls in MLS on loan through June with a purchase option. On 17 April 2021, Fábio made his debut for New York, appearing as a starter  in a 2-1 loss to Sporting Kansas City. On 1 May 2021, Fábio was named man of the match as he helped New York to a 2-0 victory over Chicago Fire FC assisting on both goals. On 10 June 2021, the Red Bulls announced that Fábio's loan had been extended until the end of the 2021 season. On 18 June 2021, Fábio scored his first goal for the club in a 2-0 victory over Nashville SC On 3 July 2021, Fábio scored the winning goal in a 2-1 victory over  Orlando City SC. On 30 October 2021, Fábio scored a game-winner during second-half stoppage time in a 1-0 victory over CF Montréal. A week later, on 7 November, Fábio scored New York's loan goal in a 1-1 draw with Nashville SC, helping the club qualify for the MLS playoffs.

Atlético Mineiro
On 7 January 2022, Fábio Gomes joined Atlético Mineiro on a four-year deal.

Loan to Vasco da Gama
On 29 July 2022, Fábio Gomes joined Vasco da Gama on loan for the remainder of the 2022 Série B season.

Loan to Paços de Ferreira
On 15 January 2023, Fábio Gomes joined Primeira Liga club Paços de Ferreira on loan for the remainder of the 2022–23 season.

Career statistics

Honours
Atlético Mineiro
Supercopa do Brasil: 2022
Campeonato Mineiro: 2022

References

External links

1997 births
Living people
Brazilian footballers
Association football forwards
Grêmio Osasco Audax Esporte Clube players
Oeste Futebol Clube players
Albirex Niigata players
New York Red Bulls players
Clube Atlético Mineiro players
CR Vasco da Gama players
F.C. Paços de Ferreira players
Campeonato Brasileiro Série A players
Campeonato Brasileiro Série B players
J2 League players
Major League Soccer players
Brazilian expatriate footballers
Brazilian expatriate sportspeople in Japan
Brazilian expatriate sportspeople in Portugal
Brazilian expatriate sportspeople in the United States
Expatriate footballers in Japan
Expatriate footballers in Portugal
Expatriate soccer players in the United States
Footballers from São Paulo